Capping may refer to:

 the creation of five-prime (5') caps in a cell nucleus
 Capping enzyme
 Capping in sport, making an appearance in a game at international level
Ambulance chasing, the practice of lawyers seeking clients at a disaster site

 Capping phrase (jakugo), a response to a Zen kōan
 Capping stunt, a New Zealand university student prank
 Capping week, New Zealand universities' graduation week

 Frequency capping in advertising
 Session capping in advertising
 Window capping in building construction
 In situ capping of subaqueous waste in environmental remediation
 Capitalization in writing
 Slang Lying, saying something that is not true. Part of AAVE